Palma (minor planet designation: 372 Palma) is one of the largest main-belt asteroids. It is a B-type asteroid.

It was discovered by Auguste Charlois on August 19, 1893, in Nice. It is thought to be named for the capital city of Majorca, an island in the Balearics (Spain), which are located south of France. It is one of seven of Charlois's discoveries that were expressly named by the Astromomisches Rechen-Institut (Astronomical Calculation Institute).

Occultations 
Since 2000, it has been observed 14 times in an asteroid occultation event, a number of which produced multiple chords revealing the asteroid's size and shape. On September 13, 2018, it was revealed to be 120 miles long (193 kilometers long). It is in a fixed orbit around the Sun between the orbits of Mars and Jupiter.

See also
 List of exceptional asteroids

References

External links
 Asteroid 372 Palma / Andromeda Galaxy Transit  (19 Oct 2011)
 
 

Background asteroids
Palma
Palma
BFC-type asteroids (Tholen)
B-type asteroids (SMASS)
18930819